The Gwangandaegyo or Diamond Bridge is a suspension bridge located in Busan, South Korea. It connects Haeundae-gu to Suyeong-gu.  The road surface is about 6,500 meters long, with the bridge as a whole spanning 7,420 meters.  It is the second longest bridge in the country after the Incheon Bridge.

Construction began in 1994 and concluded in December 2002, with a total cost of 789.9 billion won. The bridge opened temporarily in September and October 2002 for the 2002 Asian Games.  However, it was not officially opened until January, 2003.

History
The bridge made international headlines in February 2019 when a Russian cargo ship (which had just left from the Port of Busan and was heading to Vladivostok) crashed into the bridge. As a result, a five-metre wide hole was torn into the lower part of the bi-level bridge, but there were no injuries reported. The ship's captain was allegedly inebriated at the time of the crash, which may have contributed to the incident.

Notes

See also
 Busan
 Busan International Fireworks Festival
 Transportation in South Korea
 List of bridges in South Korea
 Donghae Expressway

References

External links
 

Bridges in Busan
Suspension bridges in South Korea
Bridges completed in 2002
Tourist attractions in Busan
2002 establishments in South Korea